Bert Sotlar (1921–1992) was a Yugoslav film actor. He starred in the 1959 German film Dorothea Angermann.

Filmography

References

Bibliography
 Alpi, Deborah Lazaroff. Robert Siodmak: A Biography. McFarland, 1998.

External links

1921 births
1992 deaths
Yugoslav male actors
People from Kočevje